Mika Orr is a Brooklyn-based American filmmaker best known for the short films Professional Cuddler (2017), Duet (2020), and the documentary miniseries #AMiNORMAL in 2022.

Biography
Orr earned a master's degree from the School of Visual Arts in New York City in May 2017. Her thesis project was the short film Professional Cuddler, starring Dana Ivey. She and fellow School of Visual Arts alumnus Amanda Alvich were finalists for the Coca-Cola Refreshing Filmmaker's Award in 2018 for their entry "Just One Bite."

In 2021, Orr announced work a feature-length documentary film, which is being shot concurrently in Germany, Uganda, and Colombia.

Filmography

References

External links

1985 births
21st-century American screenwriters
21st-century American women
American cinematographers
American women cinematographers
American women film directors
Living people
School of Visual Arts alumni